Terebratalia is a genus of brachiopods belonging to the family Terebrataliidae.

The species of this genus are found in Northern America and Japan.

Species:

Terebratalia asanoi 
Terebratalia batequia 
Terebratalia bialata 
Terebratalia coreanica 
Terebratalia gouldi 
Terebratalia hayasakai 
Terebratalia pacifica 
Terebratalia radiata 
Terebratalia sendaica 
Terebratalia tisimana 
Terebratalia transversa 
Terebratalia xanthica 
Terebratula tenuis

References

Brachiopod genera
Terebratulida